Thorn Electrical Industries Limited was a British electrical engineering company. It was listed on the London Stock Exchange, but merged with EMI Group to form Thorn EMI in 1979. It was de-merged in 1996 and became a constituent of the FTSE 100 Index, but was acquired by the Japanese Nomura Group only two years later. It is now owned by Terra Firma Capital Partners.

History
Sir Jules Thorn founded the company with his business partner Alfred Deutsch in March 1928 as The Electric Lamp Service Company Ltd. Thorn had worked in England as a travelling salesman for company Olso, an Austrian manufacturer of gas mantles. When Olso went bankrupt, Thorn decided to stay in England. Deutsch, an Austrian engineer, visited Thorn in 1928 and was persuaded to stay to help organize the company's production process.

Thorn acquired the Atlas Lamp Works company in 1932 and began making light bulbs in Edmonton, North London. The company grew rapidly to become Thorn Lighting, one of the world's largest producers of lamps, luminaires and lighting components. 

The name changed again to Thorn Electrical Industries in November 1936. The company later began to diversify by buying the electronics firm Ferguson Radio Corporation in the late 1950s and Ultra Electronics in 1961.

Thorn took over Glover and Main, a local Edmonton company in 1965, a gas-appliance manufacturer. Thorn manufactured television sets in Australia.

The company also owned Thorn Benham which made electrical catering equipment.
It had a joint venture in the 70's with General Telephone and Electronics of America (GTE) to try and break into the UK telephopne equipment market. GT&E was later replaced by Ericcson of Sweden who wanted a foothold in the UK equipment market and who eventually bough out Thorn's interest.

The Thorn Group's notable brands over the years included Radio Rentals, DER (both TV rental), Rumbelows (electrical goods), Tricity (cookers and fridges), Kenwood (food mixers), Thorn Kidde (fire protection), TMD
(microwave equipment) and Mazda (light bulbs).

Merger with EMI

Thorn merged with the EMI Group in October 1979, to form Thorn EMI.

On 16 August 1996, Thorn EMI shareholders voted in favour of de-merging Thorn. The electronics and rentals divisions were divested as Thorn plc.

Post demerger
Future Rentals, a subsidiary of the Nomura Group, acquired Thorn in 1998. It subsequently passed to Terra Firma Capital Partners which set up the BrightHouse chain.  The remainder of the company was sold to a private buyer in June 2007.

Big Brown Box was launched in Australia in 2008 by Thorn, and was later sold to Appliances Online, a subsidiary of Winning Appliances, in 2011. The site was an online retailer of AV equipment, consumer electronics, and appliances.

References

See also 
Thorn Lighting

Electronics companies of the United Kingdom
Electronics industry in London
Manufacturing companies based in London
Companies formerly listed on the London Stock Exchange
1928 establishments in England
1998 disestablishments in England
British companies established in 1928
Manufacturing companies established in 1928
Electronics companies established in 1928
British companies disestablished in 1998
Radio manufacturers